Melbourne and Hobson's Bay Railway Company 2-2-2WT (1854) was the first locomotive operated after the inauguration of a public railway line in Australia. It had  diameter cylinders and was capable of producing , reaching  and hauling .

On 12 September 1854, the Melbourne and Hobson's Bay Railway Company inaugurated the first railway line to operate in Australia using steam locomotives. The line extended  from a Melbourne Terminal in Flinders Street and the beach at Sandridge (now Port Melbourne). Four locomotives had been ordered from Robert Stephenson and Company in Newcastle upon Tyne in England, but manufacturing delays made it likely that the railway would be without a locomotive when it opened. The company therefore took the bold step of tasking the Melbourne foundry company Robertson, Martin & Smith, which had never produced one, to construct within 10 weeks a 2-2-2 well-tank locomotive to the design of the railway's chief engineer. The builders achieved the deadline with three days to spare. 

Robertson, Martin & Smith constructed the locomotive at Joseph Raleigh's disused boiling down works on the Saltwater River (now Maribyrnong River) near Footscray, with boiler fabrication being subcontracted to Langlands foundry. The locomotive's total cost was £2700. 

Following its trials starting on 9 September 1854, the locomotive hauled the inaugural passenger train at the official opening on 12 September 1854. It continued to do so for three months before the Stephenson locomotives went into service. Its operation was interrupted by down-time on three occasions while broken crank-axles were repaired. During those periods the 0-4-0 locomotive that had hauled ballast wagons during the railway's construction was utilised. However, on 1 December services were ended "until further notice" for an unknown period. 

It is not known when the locomotive was taken out of service and scrapped.

Notes

References

Further reading
 

2-2-2 locomotives
Railway locomotives introduced in 1854
Broad gauge locomotives in Australia